Daryoush Ashouri (born August 2, 1938, in Tehran) is a prominent Iranian thinker, author, translator, researcher, and public intellectual. He lives in Paris, France.

Work
He studied at the Faculty of Law, Political Sciences and Economics of the University of Tehran, and has been visiting professor of Persian language and literature at Tokyo University of Foreign Studies.  Ashoori taught at the Oriental Institute of the University of Oxford, and lectured on political philosophy and political sociology at the University of Tehran. From 1970 to 1978, Ashoori was a member of the second Academy of Persian Language.

Ashoori has worked extensively as an author, essayist, translator, literary interpreter, encyclopedist, and lexicologist. His intellectual interests cover a wide interdisciplinary range, including political sciences, literature, philosophy and linguistics. His main domain of intellectual focus is the cultural and linguistic matters of his native country, Iran, as a Third World country encountering modernity.

He has made vast contributions to the development of the Persian vocabulary and terminology in the domains of human sciences and philosophy by coining new words and modifying existing ones. His works in this domain are compiled in his Farhang-e 'olum-e ensāni (A Dictionary of Human Sciences). Among his major works stands a hermeneutical, an intertextual study of the Divan of Hafez (Erfān o rendi dar she'r-e Hafez) which introduces a new approach to the understanding of the great classical poet. As a translator, he has translated numerous classical literary and philosophical works by Nietzsche, Machiavelli, Shakespeare and others into Persian.

Publications 
 Selected Books:
Ta’rīf-hā va Mafhūm-e Farhang (Concept and Definitions of Culture)
Erfān-o Rendī dar She’r-e Hāfeż
Mā va Moderniyat (a collection of articles on the cultural crisis of Iranian society facing with modernity)
Farhang-e ‘Olūm-e Ensānī (English-Persian Dictionary for Human Sciences)
She’r-o Andisheh (Poetry and Thought)
Bāz-andīshi-ye Zabān-e Fārsī (Persian Language, Rethought)
Dānesh-nāme-ye Siyāsī (An Encyclopaedia of Politics)
Chenīn Goft Zartosht, a translation of the [[Thus Spoke Zarathustra| Also Sprach Zarathustra]]'' by Friedrich Nietzsche

Sources 
Iran Heritage: The Legacy of the Constitutional Revolution in Iran: A Hundred Years of Struggle For Democracy, Lecture Series by Dariush Ashoori
Aftab article on Dariush Ahouri

See also 
Intellectual movements in Iran
Persian philosophy

External links
  Official weblog

Iranian Iranologists
21st-century Iranian philosophers
Iranian translators
Writers from Tehran
University of Tehran alumni
1938 births
Living people
Third Force (Iran) politicians
Iranian expatriates in France
Iranian male writers
20th-century Iranian philosophers